Pine Lake is a  lake in Duxbury, Massachusetts in the village of Tinkertown. The lake is located southwest of Round Pond, northwest of Island Creek Pond, and east of Route 3 near the East Street underpass. The outflow is a small stream that flows into Round Pond. A small subdivision lies along the southern shore of the lake.

References

External links
Environmental Protection Agency
South Shore Coastal Watersheds - Lake Assessments

Lakes of Plymouth County, Massachusetts
Duxbury, Massachusetts
Reservoirs in Massachusetts